Sawa  is a village development committee in the Himalayas of Taplejung District in the Province No. 1 of north-eastern Nepal. At the time of the 2011 Nepal census it had a population of 2,410 people living in 501 individual households. There were 1,095 males and 1,315 females at the time of census.

Media
To promote local culture Sawa has one FM radio station Radio Tamor - 102 MHz which is a community radio Station.

References

External links
UN map of the municipalities of Taplejung District

Populated places in Taplejung District